Grandin may refer to:

People 
Egbert Bratt Grandin (1806–1845), American publisher
Elliot Grandin (born 1987), French footballer 
Ethel Grandin (1894–1988), American silent movie actress
Philomène Grandin (born 1974), Swedish actress and television personality
Temple Grandin (born 1947), American professor of animal science
Tom Grandin (1907–1977), American broadcast journalist 
Vital-Justin Grandin (1829–1902), Canadian missionary
Grandin brothers, late 19th-century American entrepreneurs

Places 
Grandin, Florida, town in Putnam County, Florida, United States
Grandin, Missouri, city in Carter County, Missouri, United States
Grandin, New Jersey, an unincorporated community in Hunterdon County, New Jersey, United States
Grandin, North Dakota, city in Cass County, North Dakota, United States
Grandin Road Commercial Historic District, an area in Roanoke, Virginia
Grandin Court, Roanoke, Virginia, a neighborhood in Roanoke, Virginia

Other uses 
Jules de Grandin, a fictional occult detective
Grandin station, now known as Government Centre station, in Edmonton, Alberta, Canada